Philip Barton Key (April 12, 1757 – July 28, 1815), was an American Loyalist during the American Revolutionary War and later was a United States Circuit Judge and Chief United States Circuit Judge of the United States circuit court for the Fourth Circuit and a United States representative from Maryland.

Education and career

Born on April 12, 1757, near Charlestown, Cecil County, Province of Maryland, British America, Key pursued an academic course. He was a Loyalist during the American Revolutionary War, fighting with the British Army from 1777 to 1781. He served in the Maryland Loyalists Battalion as a captain. Key and his entire battalion were captured by the Spanish Army– who were at war with the British– in Pensacola, Florida. Key was a prisoner for a month in Havana, Cuba before being paroled and sent to New York City, New York until the end of the war. After the war, Key went to England and graduated from the Middle Temple in London in 1784 and read law in 1785. He returned to Maryland in 1785. He was admitted to the bar and entered private practice in Leonardtown, Maryland from 1787 to 1790. He continued private practice in Annapolis, Maryland from 1790 to 1794, and from 1799 to 1800. He was a member of the Maryland House of Delegates from 1794 to 1799. He was Mayor of Annapolis from 1797 to 1798.

Federal judicial service

He was confirmed by the United States Senate on February 20, 1801, and received his commission the same day. His service terminated on March 3, 1801, due to his elevation to serve as Chief Judge of the same court.

Key was nominated by President Adams on February 25, 1801, to the United States Circuit Court for the Fourth Circuit, to the new Chief Judge seat authorized by 2 Stat. 89. He was confirmed by the Senate on February 26, 1801, and received his commission on March 3, 1801. His service terminated on July 1, 1802, due to abolition of the court.

Following his departure from the federal bench, Key resumed private practice in Montgomery County, Maryland from 1802 to 1807, also engaging in agricultural pursuits. He served as counsel for Associate Justice of the Supreme Court of the United States Samuel Chase during his Senate impeachment trial in 1805.

Congressional service

Key was elected as a Federalist from Maryland's 3rd congressional district to the United States House of Representatives of the 10th, 11th and 12th United States Congresses, serving from March 4, 1807, to March 3, 1813. He was Chairman of the United States House Committee on the District of Columbia for the 10th United States Congress.

Later career and death

Following his departure from Congress, Key resumed private practice in Georgetown, D.C. (then a separate municipality in the District of Columbia, now a neighborhood in Washington, D.C.) from 1813 to 1815. He died on July 28, 1815, in Georgetown, D.C. He was initially interred on his estate “Woodley” in Georgetown, D.C. He was re-interred in Oak Hill Cemetery in Washington, D.C.

Family

Key's cousin, Philip Key, was a United States representative from Maryland.

See also 

 Philip Key (U.S. politician), Key's cousin
 Francis Scott Key, Key's nephew
 Philip Barton Key II, Key's great-nephew
 John Eager Howard, father-in-law of Key's daughter
 William Howard (engineer), son-in-law
 George Plater, father-in-law

References

Sources 

 
 Purcell, L. Edward. Who Was Who in the American Revolution. New York: Facts on File, 1993. .
 Leepson, Marc. What So Proudly We Hailed: Francis Scott Key, A Life. New York: St. Martin's Press, 2014. .

1757 births
1815 deaths
18th-century American judges
American Loyalists from Maryland
American Revolutionary War prisoners of war held by Spain
Burials at Oak Hill Cemetery (Washington, D.C.)
Federalist Party members of the United States House of Representatives from Maryland
Judges of the United States circuit courts
Key family of Maryland
Loyalist military personnel of the American Revolutionary War
Mayors of Annapolis, Maryland
Members of the Maryland House of Delegates
People from Cecil County, Maryland
United States federal judges appointed by John Adams
United States federal judges admitted to the practice of law by reading law